The World Championship of Custom Bike Building is a competition held annually by American Motorcycle Dealer (AMD) magazine. The first competition was held in 2004 as an extension of the AMD ProShow custom engineering competition held in Europe in conjunction with Custom Chrome since 2002, which by some was already unofficially acknowledged as a European championship The top three finishers from the European Championship are rewarded with an entry to the World Championship and an expenses contribution to help with bike freight costs. There are also a number of affiliate events in various countries in Western Europe as well as in Russia, Japan, Australia and Mexico. The winner of each Affiliate event also wins expenses towards competing at the World Championship each year. The judging of the World Championship is done by 'peer review', in that all competitors collectively decide the winner, together with a select panel of invited judges from the press and aftermarket industry.

Classes
 Freestyle (World Championship) - The Freestyle Class accepts all bikes of any design and/or with any modifications. The winner of this class will be declared World Champion Custom Bike Builder for the period of one year.
 Modified Harley-Davison - Frame and engine case must be original Harley-Davidson, any modifications to the frame and the motors cylinders or heads are accepted.
 Production Manufacturer - This class is designed for entrants whose principal business is selling production motorcycles, all entries must be manufactured in 50 or more units per year.
 Metric World Championship - All entries must be built around an import metric-based engine. The winner of this class will be declared Metric World Champion Custom Bike Builder for the period of one year.

Official voting results

2004 World Championship

2005 World Championship

2005 European Championship

2006 World Championship

2006 European Championship

2007 World Championship

2007 European Championship

2008 World Championship

2008 European Championship

2009 World Championship

2009 European Championship

2010 World Championship

2010 European Championship

2011 World Championship

2012 World Championship

2013 World Championship

2014 World Championship

2016 World Championship

2018 World Championship

Affiliate events
Entrants in these events can be rewarded with free entries to the European or world championships.
Arneitz Custom Show - Faaker See, Austria
Bigtwin Bikeshow & Expo - Rosmalen, Netherlands
Cool Breaker Custom Show - Yokohama, Japan
Gold Coast Bike Week - Carrara, Queensland, Australia
Cologne Custom Championship - Cologne, Germany
Irish Motorbike & Scooter Show - Dublin, Ireland
Llunatica Benicassim - Benicassim, Spain
Mad Builders Custom Show - Jocotepec, Mexico
Moscow Custom & Tuning Show - Moscow, Russia
Moto Clube Faro Bike Show - Faro, Algarve, Portugal
Motor Bike Expo - Verona, Italy
MULAFEST International Bike Show - Madrid, Spain
Swedish Custom Bike Show - Norrtälje, Sweden
Viva La Clusaz! - La Clusaz, France

References

External links
AMD-championship Official Website
Dealer World

Vehicle modification
Motorcycling events
Motorcycling mass media
Motorcycle customization
Engineering competitions